The Shine Tag Team Championship is the tag team championship contested in the professional wrestling promotion Shine Wrestling.

Inaugural Championship Tournament (2014)

The tournament was held in one night at the "Shine 17" event on February 28, 2014 at the Orpheum in Ybor City, Florida.

The tournament brackets were:

Reigns

Combined reigns 

By team

By wrestler

See also
Shine Championship
Shine Nova Championship
Shimmer Tag Team Championship
Women's World Tag Team Championship

References

External links 

Women's professional wrestling tag team championships
WWNLive championships
Shimmer Women Athletes